Jim Brodie (born March 11, 1947) is an American politician. He served as a Republican member for the 115th district of the Florida House of Representatives.

Life and career 
Brodie attended Winona State University and Ball State University.

In 1980, Brodie was elected to represent the 115th district of the Florida House of Representatives, succeeding James F. Eckhart. He served until 1982, when he was succeeded by Tim Murphy.

References 

1947 births
Living people
Republican Party members of the Florida House of Representatives
20th-century American politicians
Winona State University alumni
Ball State University alumni